Irene Castelli (born 4 November 1983) is an Italian former gymnast. She competed at the 2000 Summer Olympics.

References

External links
 

1983 births
Living people
Italian female artistic gymnasts
Olympic gymnasts of Italy
Gymnasts at the 2000 Summer Olympics
Sportspeople from the Province of Bergamo